March law or marcher law is a system of legal compromises formerly in use in the border regions of England. Specifically, it may refer to:

March law (Anglo-Irish border)
March law (Anglo-Scottish border)
March law (Anglo-Welsh border)

See also 

 April Laws, a series of laws passed by the Hungarian Diet in March 1848, and signed by the King in April of that year